USS Pleiades (AK-46) was commissioned by the U.S. Navy for service in World War II. She was responsible for delivering military personnel and equipment to ships and stations in the war zone.

World War II North Atlantic operations 
 
Following an abbreviated shakedown, Pleiades loaded cargo at Quonset Point, Rhode Island, and on 22 November, got underway on her first convoy run through the U-boat infested waters of the North Atlantic Ocean to Iceland. Returning to New York the day after the United States entered World War II, Pleiades completed ten more convoy runs, six to Iceland and four to the United Kingdom by July 1943.

A very dangerous convoy run 

Of those, convoys ON 67 in February and Convoy SC 107, which departed New York 24 October 1942, were the most hazardous. On 1 November, with five ships in each column, 9 column convoy SC 107 took departure from Canada for Iceland, and the United Kingdom. Shortly before 20:00, a wolfpack closed on the convoy, and, for almost 70 hours, struck at the columns, repeatedly scoring hits. At 18:37, 4 November, they sank their last ship and departed, having sunk 15, and damaged one other.

Converted to general stores 
 
Steaming south, 25 July 1943, Pleiades spent August, September, and October on a Brazilian run, then, in mid-November returned to the North Atlantic to ply those waters again until June 1944. Converted to a general stores issue vessel, she joined Service Force, Atlantic, 3 July, and three weeks later departed Lynnhaven Roads for the Mediterranean.

Supporting the invasion of Southern France 
 
She anchored at Naples, Italy, 17 August; discharged cargo there until 2 September; then, acting as flagship for a convoy of LCIs, got underway for southern France. Encountering a mistral en route, she delivered her charges to Saint-Tropez, 4 September. From the 5th through the 23rd, she distributed supplies to U.S. 8th Fleet units at St. Tropez, San Raphael, and Marseilles, then sailed to Bizerte, whence she returned to the United States, mooring at Boston, Massachusetts, 29 October.

Tropical South Atlantic runs 
 
Following alterations, Pleiades steamed to Bayonne, New Jersey, to load cargo for Brazil. She completed that Belém-Recife-Bahia run at New York, 12 January 1945; underwent repairs; and then commenced a series of sugar runs to the Caribbean which continued until after the end of World War II. On 4 November, she arrived at New York to complete her last cargo run as a U.S. Navy ship.

Post-war decommissioning 

Decommissioned 21 November, she was returned, the same day, to the Maritime Commission, under which she resumed merchant service with the name .

Military awards and honors 
 
Pleiades (AK-46) earned two battle stars for World War II service. Her crew members were eligible for the following medals:
 Combat Action Ribbon (Convoy SC-107, 1–4 November 1943)
 American Defense Service Medal (with Fleet clasp)
 American Campaign Medal
 Europe-Africa-Middle East Campaign Medal (2)
 World War II Victory Medal

References

External links 
 NavSource Online: Service Ship Photo Archive - AK-46 Pleiades

Ships built in Palermo
Ships built by Cantieri Navali del Tirreno e Riuniti
1939 ships
World War II merchant ships of Romania
Cargo ships of the United States Navy
World War II auxiliary ships of the United States